"Ghost Voices" is a song by American electronic music producer Porter Robinson under the alias Virtual Self. It was released on November 8, 2017 as the second single from the alias' debut EP Virtual Self. Robinson wrote, produced, and performed the track. The song is classified by Robinson on Twitter as "neotrance".

An official audio video was released via Robinson's YouTube channel, in which the song plays over a visualizer depicting moving orbs of light orbiting a floating crystal connected by cables to something off-screen.

An official music video was released via Robinson's YouTube channel on February 28, 2018.

In July 2018, Robinson released a trance remix of the song, "Angel Voices", one of VR game Beat Saber'''s default tracks. "Ghost Voices" received a nomination for Best Dance Recording at the 61st Annual Grammy Awards.

 Background 
Released fourteen days after Virtual Self's first release, "Eon Break", "Ghost Voices" was announced via Robinson's Twitter account, as well as the Twitter account of Virtual Self. The track follows in the previous single's footsteps, as it is also a stark divergence from Robinson's collaboration with fellow electronic music producer and close friend Madeon, "Shelter", as well as Robinson's debut album, Worlds.

Virtual Self continued to build on its cryptic, techno-based social media presence with the release of "Ghost Voices".

 Composition 

"Ghost Voices" begins with a vocal-like synth, not dissimilar to some of Robinson's Worlds'' synths. The drums then join in, with a classic trance beat. A vocal then joins in, with a heavy echo placed on it. The synths that follow are reminiscent of the late 1990s and early 2000s trance music sounds, with heavy delays and echoed vocals.

The track includes elements of trance and deep house.

Critical Reception 
Philip Sherburne of Pitchfork stated in his review of Virtual Self, "...the song’s lithe vocal flips and slinky air peg it to the post-Disclosure era; it’s the record’s most contemporary-sounding cut."

Trillvo stated that "Hearing songs like this and 'Eon Break', I can’t help but think back to those old school video games that seemed to inspire tracks like these. This track reminds me of some catchy menu music you’d hear in a Marvel Vs. Capcom or Tekken game, and I absolutely love that feeling of nostalgia."

Release history

Charts

References

External links
 
 

2017 singles
2017 songs
Porter Robinson songs
House music songs
Song recordings produced by Porter Robinson
Songs written by Porter Robinson